Garmurt-e Ramazanabad (also Romanized as Garmūrt-e Ramaz̤ānābād; also known as Garmūt-e Mīrzā Khān, Garmūrd, Garmūrt, and Germūrth) is a village in Kashkan Rural District, Shahivand District, Dowreh County, Lorestan Province, Iran. At the 2006 census, its population was 420, in 92 families.

References 

Towns and villages in Dowreh County